Portrait of Rodrigo Vázquez de Arce is an anonymous copy of a lost 1587-1597 painting by El Greco. It is now in the Museo del Prado in Madrid. It shows Rodrigo Vázquez de Arce, president of the Council of Castille, who also features in the same artist's The Burial of Count Orgaz. Although it is different from other portraits by the artist, it still shows the strong influence of Titian and Tintoretto, who he had met in Venice.

References

Paintings by El Greco in the Museo del Prado
Vázquez, Rodrigo
1580s paintings
1590s paintings